Jessica Eriyo (26 August 1969 – 12 August 2022) was a Ugandan educator, social worker, politician and diplomat. She served as the Deputy Secretary General of the East African Community, (EAC), responsible for Productive & Social Sectors. She was appointed to that position on 30 April 2012.

Background and education
Eriyo was born in Adjumani District on 26 August 1969. She held a degree of Bachelor of Arts in social science and a diploma in education. She also held two certificates; a certificate in project planning and management and a certificate in computer science. She was awarded a Master of Arts degree in development studies by Makerere University.

Early career 
In 1994, Eriyo worked as a high school teacher at Kololo Senior Secondary School in Kololo, an affluent suburb of Kampala, the capital of Uganda and the largest city in that country. Between 1998 and 1999, she was a teacher at Our Lady Consolata Senior Secondary School. She served as the District Population Officer in Adjumani District, from 1999 until 2001.

Political career 
She entered politics in 2001, contesting the parliamentary seat of Adjumani District Women's Representative. She won and was again re-elected in 2006 on the National Resistance Movement political party ticket, and served in the parliament until 2011. In the 2011 national elections, she lost her seat to Jesca Ababiku, an independent candidate.

Eriyo served as the State Minister for the Environment in the Ugandan Cabinet, from 2006 until 2011. In the cabinet reshuffle of 27 May 2011, she was dropped and replaced by Flavia Munaaba.

In April 2012, Eriyo was appointed Deputy Secretary General for Productive and Social Sectors at the East African Community. She replaced Beatrice Kiraso, another Ugandan, who served in that position between April 2006 and April 2012.

Personal life
Eriyo died at MD Anderson Cancer Center in Houston, United States, where she was undergoing treatment for cancer on 12 August 2022, at the age of 52.

See also

Notes

References

External links
 Website of the Parliament of Uganda
 Website of the East African Community
  Full Ministerial Cabinet List, June 2006
  Full Ministerial Cabinet List, February 2009
 Full Ministerial Cabinet List, May 2011.

1969 births
2022 deaths 
Deaths from cancer in Texas
Madi people
People from Adjumani District
Members of the Parliament of Uganda
Government ministers of Uganda
National Resistance Movement politicians
Ugandan educators
People from West Nile sub-region
Makerere University alumni
21st-century Ugandan women politicians
21st-century Ugandan politicians
Women government ministers of Uganda
Women members of the Parliament of Uganda